China International Consumer Goods Fair (CICGF) is the largest professional consumer goods fair in China, which ranks only second to Canton Fair among all the exhibitions sponsored by China's Ministry of Commerce. It is approved by the China State Council, and is co-sponsored by Ministry of Commerce and the government of Zhejiang Province.

CICGF is held in the harbor city of Ningbo in June of every year. Products from many industries are showcased. Industries include home appliances and electronics, textiles, sports and recreational products, and household products and gifts.

References

External links
CICGF website

Trade fairs in China
Summer events in China